USS Breeman (DE-104) was a Cannon class destroyer escort in service with the United States Navy from 1943 to 1946. In 1948, she was sold to Taiwan, where she served as Taihu (太湖) until 1972.

History

United States Navy (1943–1948)
The ship was named for George Breeman, a Navy seaman who was awarded the Medal of Honor for extraordinary heroism during a turret explosion on USS Kearsarge (BB-5).

Breeman (DE-104) was laid down on 20 March 1943 at the Dravo Corporation shipyard in Wilmington, Delaware; launched on 4 September 1943, sponsored by Mrs. Marie Breeman Schellgell, niece of the late Chief Turret Captain Breeman; completed at the Norfolk Navy Yard; and commissioned there on 12 December 1943.

The destroyer escort spent the remainder of 1943 and the first week in 1944 outfitting at Norfolk. On 11 January 1944, she embarked upon her shakedown cruise to the waters around Bermuda. She completed the training period on 1 February and returned to Norfolk on 5 February for post-shakedown repairs. After fueling off Fayal in the Azores, the task group headed north to provide antisubmarine support for transatlantic convoys. Though Breeman appears to have taken no direct part in the attacks, the task group accounted for at least two U-boats before entering Casablanca on 8 March. The destroyer escort put to sea with the Block Island task group again on 12 March. On the 19th, planes from Block Island sank , and Breeman assisted in the rescue of the U-boat's survivors.

Breeman and  parted company with TG 21.16 on 23 March.  The following day, the two destroyer escorts put into Dakar, French West Africa, and began loading an unusual cargo – 60 million dollars in gold belonging to the Bank of Poland.  The two warships departed Dakar on 26 March and proceeded to New York by the most direct and safest route and arrived there on 3 April.  Following repairs, Breeman returned to sea on 12 April with another hunter-killer force which formed a portion of the screen for Convoy UGS-39.  She and her convoy entered Bizerte, Tunisia, safely on 3 May.  On the return voyage, the destroyer escort helped to screen Convoy GUS 39, arriving in Norfolk on 29 May.  After an availability at the New York Navy Yard, she spent nine days during mid-June engaged in training at Casco Bay, Maine.

On 21 June, the destroyer escort headed south to the vicinity of Bermuda where she joined TG 22.10—another hunter-killer group built around Card (CVE-11).  Once again, the task group attacked a number of sonar contacts and sank at least one U-boat.  Breeman, however, shared none of the credit for the sinking.  The warship returned to New York late in August and, after repairs, conducted training at Casco Bay in early September.  On 18 September, she rejoined the Card task group near Bermuda for further training.  Soon thereafter, Breeman suffered propeller damage that forced her to return to the New York Navy Yard.  She completed repairs by 23 October, and put to sea that same day for torpedo training at the Submarine Base, New London, Connecticut, and in Casco Bay.  On 24 November the destroyer escort and the rest of CortDiv 48 joined company with Card once again to form TG 22.2.  For about a month, the warship trained in anti-submarine warfare (ASW) tactics in the waters surrounding Bermuda.  She returned to New York on 29 December.

Breeman rejoined TG 22.2 on 12 January 1945 to act as plane guard and escort during carrier qualifications off Quonset Point, Rhode Island.  On 22 January, the destroyer escort and her colleagues of CortDiv 48 joined Bogue (CVE-9) in shaping a course for Norfolk.  In late February and early March, Breeman returned to sea with a hunter-killer group built around Bogue for a fruitless search for German weather submarines purportedly operating to the south of Iceland.  She and the rest of her task group entered New York on 17 March.  During the first part of April, the destroyer escort conducted training at New London as a unit of a hunter-killer group built around Card.  Between 15 April and 5 May, that task group hunted for submarines off the Virginia capes.  Later, in May, Breeman moved north to Quonset Point where she served as a plane guard during carrier qualifications.

In mid-August, the warship joined Mission Bay (CVE-59) in a voyage to Port Everglades, Florida.  Once again plane guard operations occupied her time during the visit to the Florida coast.

On 2 October, however, she headed north once again.  At the New York Navy Yard, Breeman began the inactivation process.  That phase lasted until 13 November when she got underway for Florida again.  On 16 November, the destroyer escort arrived in Green Cove Springs, Florida, to begin final preparations for decommissioning.  Breeman was decommissioned on 26 April 1946 and berthed with the Green Cove Springs Group, Atlantic Reserve Fleet.

Republic of China Navy (1948–1972)
She remained there until 29 October 1948 at which time she was transferred to the Nationalist Chinese government based on Taiwan.  She was commissioned in their Navy as Taihu (太湖) (DE-24). Her name was struck from the Navy list on 22 December 1948.

Honors
Breeman earned one battle star for World War II service.

Notes

References

External links 

      George Breeman and USS Breeman
   navsource.org: USS Breeman
        hazegray.org: USS Breeman

Cannon-class destroyer escorts of the United States Navy
Ships built in Wilmington, Delaware
1943 ships
World War II frigates and destroyer escorts of the United States
Cannon-class destroyer escorts of the Republic of China Navy